Hyloxalus aeruginosus is a species of poison dart frog endemic to Peru.

Description 
This frog is moderately sized, with a dark moss green back. The iris is brown with the pupil surrounded by a cream ring. The throat, chest, and anterior part of belly are olive brown speckled with cream colored spots. The posterior belly is dark yellow.

Distribution 
This species is endemic to the province of Rioja in Peru, where it can be found on the steep eastern slope of the Cordillera Central of the Andes. It has a very limited geographical range.

Habitat 
It lives in small, rocky streams in montane forests.

Behaviour

Breeding 
After mating, the female probably lays eggs on land, and after the eggs hatch one of the parents take the tadpoles to a pool to grow.

References 

aeruginosus
Fauna of Peru